All Saints is a closed Anglican church in Corn Street, Bristol. For many years it was used as a Diocesan Education Centre but this closed in 2015. The building has been designated as a grade II* listed building.

History

The west end of the nave survives from the original 12th-century church, and the east nave and aisles were built in the 15th century. Alice Chestre made major donations to the church. The north-east tower was added in 1716 by William Paul, and completed by George Townesend. The lantern was rebuilt by Luke Henwood in 1807, and the chancel rebuilt in the mid-19th century.

The Kalendars, a brotherhood of clergy and laity attached to All Saints, built a library over the north aisle of the church in the fifteenth century; by a deed of 1464 they gave free access to all who wished to study. This was the first 'public' library in the kingdom. In 1466 fire destroyed many of the manuscript books.

The church is surrounded on three sides by pedestrian passageways and built into surrounding buildings. Over the south nave is a priests' room and over the north a Georgian coffee room. The most notable monument marks the grave of Edward Colston, the slave trader and philanthropist. It was designed by James Gibbs and carved by John Michael Rysbrack.

Archives
Parish records for All Saints' Church, Bristol are held at Bristol Archives (Ref. P.AS) (online catalogue), including baptism, marriage and burial registers. The archive also includes records of the incumbent, overseer of the poor, churchwardens, charities, chantries and vestry, plus deeds, maps, plans and surveys.

See also

 Grade II* listed buildings in Bristol
 Churches in Bristol

References

External links
All Saint Church @ Church Crawler ( ( 2009-10-25)

All Saints
All Saints
12th-century church buildings in England